The Spell of the Poppy is a 1915 short drama film directed by Tod Browning. It concerns Manfredi, a young opium addict.

Cast
 Eugene Pallette as Manfredi
 Lucille Young as Zuletta
 Joseph Henabery as John Hale

References

External links

1915 films
Silent American drama films
American silent short films
American black-and-white films
1915 drama films
1915 short films
Films directed by Tod Browning
Films about opium
1910s American films
1910s English-language films
American drama short films